Sparganothis mesospila, the white-tailed fruitworm moth, is a species of moth of the family Tortricidae. It is found in eastern North America, including Connecticut, Illinois, Indiana, Kentucky, Maine, Maryland, Massachusetts, Michigan, New York, Ohio, Ontario, Pennsylvania, Quebec, Tennessee and West Virginia.

The wingspan is 15–17 mm. The forewings are bright yellow with golden coppery scales. The hindwings are ochreous white.

The larvae feed on Acer species. They feed inside a rolled leaf.

References

Moths described in 1875
Sparganothis